Milk Famous is the third album by American indie rock band the White Rabbits.  It was released on March 6, 2012, on TBD Records.

Track listing
 "Heavy Metal" (4:27)
 "I'm Not Me" (3:37)
 "Hold It to the Fire" (3:41)
 "Everyone Can't Be Confused" (3:01)
 "Temporary" (3:40)
 "Are You Free" (3:14)
 "It's Frightening" (2:51)
 "Danny Come Inside" (4:21)
 "Back for More" (4:05)
 "The Day You Won the War" (3:20)
 "I Had It Coming" (4:08)

References

External links
 White Rabbits Interview nthWORD Magazine

2012 albums
White Rabbits (band) albums
Mute Records albums
TBD Records albums